Coiled-coil domain containing 115 is a protein that in humans is encoded by the CCDC115 gene.

Function

The protein encoded by this gene has been observed to localize to the endoplasmic reticulum (ER)-Golgi intermediate compartment (ERGIC) and coat protein complex I (COPI) vesicles in some human cells. The encoded protein shares some homology with the yeast V-ATPase assembly factor Vma22p, and the orthologous protein in mouse promotes cell proliferation and suppresses cell death. Defects in this gene are a cause of congenital disorder of glycosylation, type IIo in humans. [provided by RefSeq, Mar 2016].

References

Further reading